ABLV may refer to:

 ABLV Bank
 ABV (TV station), callsign ABLV
 Australian bat lyssavirus